Paschal House was a historic home located at Raleigh, Wake County, North Carolina.  It was built in 1950, and was a one-story, irregularly massed, Modern Movement / Wrightian-style dwelling.  It had a picturesque composition of stone walls, multiple low-sloped gables with deep overhangs, and expanses of glazed wall. The house was demolished in 2013.

It was listed on the National Register of Historic Places in 1994.

References

Houses on the National Register of Historic Places in North Carolina
Modernist architecture in North Carolina
Houses completed in 1950
Houses in Raleigh, North Carolina
National Register of Historic Places in Raleigh, North Carolina